Bath and North East Somerset (commonly referred to as BANES or B&NES) is a unitary authority created on 1 April 1996, following the abolition of the County of Avon, which had existed since 1974. It stretches from the outskirts of Bristol, south into the Mendip Hills and east to the southern Cotswold Hills and Wiltshire border. The city of Bath is the principal settlement in the district, but BANES also covers Keynsham, Midsomer Norton, Radstock and the Chew Valley. The area has a population of 170,000, about half of whom live in Bath, making it 12 times more densely populated than the rest of the area.

In the United Kingdom, the term listed building refers to a building or other structure officially designated as being of special architectural, historical, or cultural significance; Grade I structures are those considered to be "buildings of exceptional interest". Listing was begun by a provision in the Town and Country Planning Act 1947. Once listed, strict limitations are imposed on the modifications allowed to a building's structure or fittings. In England, the authority for listing under the Planning (Listed Buildings and Conservation Areas) Act 1990 rests with Historic England, a non-departmental public body sponsored by the Department for Digital, Culture, Media and Sport; local authorities have a responsibility to regulate and enforce the planning regulations.

Bath and North East Somerset has 663 Grade I listed buildings, one of the highest concentrations in the country, covered by about 120 Historic England listings. The oldest sites within Bath are the Roman Baths, for which the foundation piles and an irregular stone chamber lined with lead were built during the Roman occupation of Britain, although the current building is from the 18th century. Bath Abbey was a Norman church built on earlier foundations, although the present building dates from the early 16th century and shows a late Perpendicular style with flying buttresses and crocketed pinnacles decorating a crenellated and pierced parapet. The medieval era is represented by the remains of the city walls in Upper Borough Walls.

Most of Bath's Grade I listed buildings are made from the local golden-coloured Bath Stone, and date from the 18th and 19th centuries. Their dominant architectural style is Georgian, which evolved from the Palladian revival style that became popular during the early 18th century. This led to the entire city's designation as a World Heritage Site. Much of the development, and many of the buildings, were the vision of John Wood, the Elder. The Circus is seen as the pinnacle of Wood's work: it consists of three long, curved terraces that form a circular space or theatre intended for civic functions and games. The games give a clue to the design, the inspiration for which was the Colosseum in Rome. The best known of Bath's terraces is the Royal Crescent, built between 1767 and 1774 and designed by Wood's son, John Wood, the Younger. Around 1770 the neoclassical architect Robert Adam designed Pulteney Bridge, a three-arched bridge spanning the Avon. He used as his prototype an original, but unused, design by Palladio for the Rialto Bridge in Venice. The heart of the Georgian city was the Pump Room, which together with its associated Lower Assembly Rooms was designed by Thomas Baldwin, a local builder responsible for many other buildings in the city, including the terraces in Argyle Street.

Outside the city of Bath, most of the Grade I listed buildings are Norman or medieval-era churches, many of which are included in the Somerset towers, a collection of distinctive, mostly spireless, Gothic church towers. Manor houses such as Claverton Manor, which now houses the American Museum in Britain, and the 18th-century Newton Park, which has a landscape garden designed by Capability Brown, also appear in the list; Newton Park now forms part of the Bath Spa University. Canal architecture includes Dundas Aqueduct and Claverton Pumping Station, both designed by John Rennie. The most recent building is the agricultural Eastwood Manor Farm Steading, completed in 1860.

Buildings

|}

See also
 Grade I listed buildings in Somerset
 Buildings and architecture of Bath
 Grade II* listed buildings in Bath and North East Somerset

Notes

References

External links

 
 Grade I

Lists of Grade I listed buildings in Somerset
Bath, Somerset-related lists